The Big Dipper was a wooden roller coaster operating at Luna Park Sydney from 1935 until 1979. It was demolished in 1981. First constructed in 1930 to an American design, the wooden Big Dipper roller coaster was a mainstay of Luna Park Glenelg during its four years of operation. The ride was dismantled and shipped to Sydney when the Glenelg park went into voluntary liquidation in 1934, and became the biggest attraction of the newly opened Luna Park Milsons Point (which was later renamed Luna Park Sydney).

The Big Dipper remained popular throughout its operating life. The coaster became inactive when Luna Park was closed following the 1979 Sydney Ghost Train fire, and was demolished and burned, along with most of the 'old' Luna Park, when Australian Amusements Associates took over the site on 3 June 1981. Two of the nine roller coaster cars were purchased at the auction before the demolition; one is on display within Luna Park today, while the other is part of the Powerhouse Museum collection.

Incidents

On New Year's Eve 1932, a woman who was improperly seated and not holding on fell from the Big Dipper, and died in hospital the next day. Although allegations of intoxication or mechanical failure were made, the inquest concluded that the woman had committed suicide.

On 26 April 1946, a 33-year-old man from New Caledonia was killed on the ride. He disobeyed safety instructions by sitting on the edge of a train car, and was thrown from the ride on one of the corners and into a support pole.

On 16 April 1979, 13 people were injured on the Big Dipper. A steel runner had come loose, halting one of the three rollercoaster trains. The following train rammed the stationary one, causing the injuries.

Successors

In 1994, a steel roller coaster was installed at Luna Park, and was given the Big Dipper name. Legal action against the new roller coaster led to significant restrictions in its operational availability, which contributed to the 1996 closure of Luna Park. The ride was sold to Dreamworld in 2001, where it currently operates as The Gold Coaster.

On 26 December 2021 a new Big Dipper opened, manufactured by Intamin. It is the first Hot Racer coaster, and the first launched single rail coaster in the world.

References
 
 Historical information boards located at Luna Park Sydney

External links
 

Roller coasters in Australia